The 2011 All-Ireland Senior Football Championship was the 125th edition of the GAA's premier inter-county Gaelic football tournament, played between 31 counties of Ireland (excluding Kilkenny who only take part in the hurling championship), London and New York. The draw for the 2011 championship took place on 7 October 2010. The 2011 All-Ireland Senior Football Championship Final took place at Croke Park on 18 September 2011, with Dublin winning their 23rd title.

Dublin and Donegal's All-Ireland semi-final in the 2011 championship was the lowest scoring in the era of 70-minute games (1975 onwards).

Format
Four knockout (single elimination format) provincial championships were played. Kilkenny did not contest the football championship. London and New York competed in Connacht. The four provincial champions advanced to the All-Ireland quarter-finals.
The sixteen teams eliminated before reaching a provincial semi-final competed in Round One of the Qualifiers (New York did not compete). The eight winners of Round One advanced to Round Two.
Qualifiers, Round Two: The eight teams eliminated in provincial semi-finals each played one of the eight winners of Round One.
Qualifiers, Round Three: The eight winners of Round Two played off to reduce the number to four.
Qualifiers, Round Four: The four teams eliminated in provincial finals each played one of the four winners of Round Three.
All-Ireland Quarter-finals: The four provincial champions each played one of the four winners of Round Four.
The winners of the All-Ireland Quarter-finals then advanced to the Semi-finals, and the winners of the Semi-finals went on to the 2011 All-Ireland Senior Football Championship Final.

Fixtures and results

Munster Senior Football Championship

Leinster Senior Football Championship

Connacht Senior Football Championship

Ulster Senior Football Championship

All-Ireland qualifiers

Round 1
On 12 June 2011, the draw was made for the first round of the All Ireland Qualifiers.  This draw contained all the teams who had been knocked out of their provincial competitions prior to the semi final stage, apart from New York.

Round 2
On 26 June 2011, the draw for Round 2 took place in Castlebar. This consisted of the winners of round one and losers of provincial semi-finals. Home advantage was given to the team drawn first.

Round 3
On 10 July 2011, the draw for Rounds 3 and 4 took place. Round 3 consisted of the 8 winners of round two playing each other to reduce the number to 4.  Round 4 consisted of losers of provincial finals playing the winners of Round 3. For Round 3, home advantage was given to the team drawn first, while Round 4 would be played at neutral venues.

Round 4

All-Ireland series

Quarter-finals
The draw for the All-Ireland quarter-finals took place on 24 July 2011, and consisted of the provincial winners playing against the winners of round 4 of the qualifiers.  Originally, all the matches were due to take place on the weekend of 30 July 2011, but due to a draw requiring a replay during the qualifiers, one match was scheduled for the following weekend.  All matches were scheduled to be played in Croke Park, Dublin.

Semi-finals

Final

Championship statistics

Miscellaneous

 Donegal won their first Ulster title since 1992.
 Waterford won their first-ever qualifier match, beating London.

Scoring

First goal of the championship: Kevin Higgins for Roscommon against New York (Connacht Quarter-final)
Last goal of the championship: Kevin McManamon for Dublin against Kerry (All-Ireland Final)
Widest winning margin: 18 points
Cork 5-17 - 2-8 Waterford (Munster Semi-final)
Most goals in a match: 7
Cork 5-17 - 2-8 Waterford (Munster semi-final)
Meath 5-8 - 2-8 Louth (Qualifier round 1)
Most points in a match: 39
Wexford 1-24 - 0-15 Westmeath (Leinster quarter-final)
Most goals by one team in a match: 5
Cork 5-17 - 2-8 Waterford (Munster semi-final)
Meath 5-8 - 2-8 Louth (Qualifier round 1)
 Highest aggregate score: 47 points
Kerry 1-26 - 3-9 Limerick (Munster semi-final)
Lowest aggregate score: 14 points
Dublin 0-8 - 0-6 Donegal (All-Ireland semi-final)
Most goals scored by a losing team: 3
Limerick 3-9 - 1-26 Kerry (Munster semi-final)
Most points scored by a losing team: 17
Wexford 1-17 - 1-18 Limerick (Qualifier round 4)

Top scorers

Season

Single game

Awards
Monthly

All Stars Awards
The 2011 All Stars Awards nominations were announced on 3 October 2011.  On 21 October, the winners of the awards were announced at an event at the National Convention Centre in Dublin.  Alan Brogan was named All Stars Footballer of the Year and Cillian O'Connor was named All Stars Young Footballer of the Year.

Media

Media coverage

PPV web coverage also available on Setanta-i website.

This Is Our Year

This Is Our Year is a 2011 book by journalist Declan Bogue. The book examines the 2011 All-Ireland Senior Football Championship from the perspectives of ten Gaelic footballers from Ulster. The book achieved notoriety after Donegal footballer Kevin Cassidy was dropped from the team squad by manager Jim McGuinness over his contributions. He released a statement in November 2011 saying it "appears my inter-county career is over".

See also
 2011 All-Ireland Minor Football Championship
 2011 All-Ireland Senior Hurling Championship

References

 
All-Ireland Senior Football Championship